The Nisbet Provincial Forest is a provincially protected mixed-wood forest surrounded by Aspen parkland in Central Saskatchewan, Canada. It consists of a north block north of the city of Prince Albert, Saskatchewan, and a south block between Duck Lake, Saskatchewan, and MacDowall, Saskatchewan. The forest drew Métis and white settlers to the area during the 1860s to 1880s and was an important source of building materials and fuel in this period. Today it is a provincially protected area although cattle grazing and recreational use including cross country skiing, snowmobiling, hiking, and hunting in the area are permitted.

The Louis Riel Trail runs through the south block of the Nisbet forest. The forest was named for James Nisbet, a Presbyterian clergyman who established a mission at Prince Albert.

See also
 List of Saskatchewan provincial forests

External links
 Presents an overview of the history and ecology of the Nisbet Provincial Forest
    Atlas of Canada Map of the Nisbet Provincial Forest

Buckland No. 491, Saskatchewan
Duck Lake No. 463, Saskatchewan
Forests of Saskatchewan
Protected areas of Saskatchewan
Division No. 15, Saskatchewan